Parides phosphorus  is a species of butterfly in the family Papilionidae. It is found in the Neotropical realm.

The larvae feed on Aristolochia.

Subspecies
P. p. phosphorus Guianas, eastern Venezuela, Brazil (Pará)
P. p. gratianus (Hewitson, 1861) Colombia
P. p. vavi Racheli, 1992
P. p. zopyron Lamas, 1998 northern Peru
P. p. laurae Bollino & Costa, 2004 southeastern Venezuela

Description from Seitz

P. phosphorus. Palpi red. Forewing somewhat transparent distally; male with dirty-green spot; hindwing rather strongly dentate, the red spots remote from the cell. Tibiae armed with spines, not thickened. Female with grey-green area on the forewing before the hindmargin, which occurs in no other female of the Aristolochia- Papilios. Colombia; Guiana; Lower Amazon; East Peru; perhaps more widely distributed. A rare insect; probably a swamp species which escapes observation. Two subspecies: — phosphorus Bates (3c) occurs in British Guiana and at the Lower Amazon. The green spot on the forewing of the male is narrow and separated from the cell. The forewing of the female has a row of 4 white spots on the grey-green area (always?). — gratianus Hew. (3 c) inhabits Colombia and East Peru. The green spot on the forewing of the male is much broader than in the preceding form; hindwing with only 3, or rarely 4, red spots, the series not curved.
Forewing of the female with two white spots; the posterior spots of the hindwing large

Description from Rothschild and Jordan(1906)
A full description is provided by Rothschild, W. and Jordan, K. (1906)

Taxonomy

Parides  phosphorus is a member of the anchises species group

The members are
Parides anchises 
Parides cutorina 
Parides erithalion 
Parides iphidamas 
Parides panares 
Parides phosphorus 
Parides vertumnus

References

Lewis, H. L., 1974 Butterflies of the World  Page 26, figure 20
Edwin Möhn, 2006 Schmetterlinge der Erde, Butterflies of the World Part XXVI (26), Papilionidae XIII. Parides. Edited by Erich Bauer and Thomas Frankenbach Keltern: Goecke & Evers; Canterbury: Hillside Books.  (Supplement 13 in English - by Racheli)

Butterflies described in 1861
Parides
Papilionidae of South America
Taxa named by Henry Walter Bates